Tharindu Dilshan (born 30 September 1992) is a Sri Lankan cricketer. He made his List A debut for Vauniya District in the 2016–17 Districts One Day Tournament on 18 March 2017. He made his Twenty20 debut for Sri Lanka Police Sports Club in the 2017–18 SLC Twenty20 Tournament on 24 February 2018.

References

External links
 

1992 births
Living people
Sri Lankan cricketers
Sri Lanka Police Sports Club cricketers
Vauniya District cricketers
Sportspeople from Moratuwa